Three steamships of the Clan Line were named Clan Mackinnon.

, in service 1891–1902, sold to Furness, Withy & Co Ltd.
, in service 1902–27, sold to Finland.
, in service 1946–55, transferred to Houston Line.

Ship names